A. Pappa Sundaram (1931/1932 – 18 April 2021) was an Indian politician and  Member of the Tamil Nadu Legislative Assembly from Kulithalai. Previously, he was elected as an Anna Dravida Munnetra Kazhagam (Jayalalitha) candidate in 1989 election, and as an Anna Dravida Munnetra Kazhagam candidate in the 1991, 2001 and 2011 elections.

Sundaram died from lung congestion at age 89 on 18 April 2021.

References 

1930s births
2021 deaths
All India Anna Dravida Munnetra Kazhagam politicians
Tamil Nadu MLAs 1991–1996
People from Karur district